The Uttar Pradesh Council of Ministers is the council in 18th Uttar Pradesh Legislative Assembly headed by Chief Minister Yogi Adityanath since 25 March 2022. As per the Constitution of India, the Uttar Pradesh Council of Ministers, including the Chief Minister, can have maximumn 60 members.

Currently there are 53 Ministers. Along with the Chief Minister, 19 are Cabinet ministers, 14 are State ministers with Independent charge and 20 are State ministers. Out of the 53 ministers, 51 belongs to the BJP while NISHAD Party & AD(S) have 1 minister each.

Council of Ministers 
Source:

Cabinet Ministers 

|}

Ministers of State (Independent Charge) 

|}

Minister of State 

|}

References

Government of Uttar Pradesh
State council of ministers of India